Crystal King may refer to:

 Crystal King, a Japanese rock band active since 1979, known for performing the original theme song for the anime television series Fist of the North Star
 A fictional character in Paper Mario